Vow is an Australian company that plans to grow cultured meat for commercial distribution.

Origin 
Vow was founded in 2019 and is headquartered in Sydney, Australia. aiming to grow sustainable cultured meat. The company was founded by George Peppou (CEO) and Tim Noakesmith (CCO). The company plans to produce various meat products using biotechnology to induce stem cells to differentiate into muscle tissue, connective tissue and other tissue types and to manufacture the meat products in bioreactors.

Proof of concept 
In July 2019, Vow demonstrated a kangaroo dumpling, the first non-farmed meat demonstrated using cultured meat technology.

In August 2020 they demonstrated a further five species in partnership with Australian chef Neil Perry.  During 2020 the company was criticised for plans to produce zebra meat.

Product offerings 
In August 2021, the company announced they were developing hybrid products containing cultured meat and ingredients produced using precision fermentation technology. The company said that work was being done in the areas of chicken, crocodile, kangaroo and water buffalo meat.

During an interview on The Drum in January 2022, the company announced their first product will be crocodile and launching in Singapore.

In November 2022 Vow announced they are launching Morsel, cultured Umai Quail.

References 

Australian companies established in 2019
Companies based in Sydney
Food technology organizations